Sisters in Arms is a French war-drama film based on historic events related to the Genocide of Yazidis by the Islamic State, written and directed by Caroline Fourest. The film was released in October 2019.

Plot
Kenza and Yaël are two young French women who go to Syria and join the 'Snake brigade', an international battalion of women fighting the ISIS alongside the Kurdish forces. There they meet Zara, a Yazidi survivor. Born in different cultures but deeply united, the women fighters heal their past wounds and discover their present strength, especially the fear they inspire in their opponents. The three young women soon bound together and become true sisters-in-arms.

Cast
 Dilan Gwyn as Zara
 Amira Casar as Commander
 Camélia Jordana as Kenza 
 Esther Garrel as Yaël
 Maya Sansa as Mother Sun 
 Nanna Blondell as Snipe
 Pascal Greggory as Agent de la coalition
 Noush Skaugen as Lady Kurda
 Mark Ryder as Al Britani 
 Korkmaz Arslan as Commander
 Youssef Douazou as El Tounsi

Production
Sisters in Arms was written and directed by Caroline Fourest, with a budget of €5.6 million. The project was announced in January 2018 under the title Red Snake.

See also
Genocide of Yazidis by the Islamic State

References

External links
 

2019 films
French drama films
French feminist films
Films set in Syria
2010s English-language films
2010s French films